Frank King (13 March 1917 – c. 2003) was an English football goalkeeper who played for Blyth Spartans, Everton, and Derby County in the 1930s. He played five First Division games for the "Toffees" in both 1934–35 and 1935–36, and three times in 1936–37. He kept goal in the Merseyside derby at the age of 17. However, he was unable to trouble the club's firmly established number one, Ted Sagar, and was transferred to Derby. There he picked up an injury after a challenge from Stoke City's Freddie Steele. Further injury problems forced his retirement at age 22, at which point he joined the police force. He guested for Southport during World War II. After the war he worked as a physio at Leicester City, Luton Town, and the Football Association. He died at the age of 86. He was the brother of former footballers George and Ray King.

References

1917 births
2003 deaths
People from Alnwick
English footballers
Association football goalkeepers
Blyth Spartans A.F.C. players
Derby County F.C. players
Everton F.C. players
Southport F.C. wartime guest players
English Football League players
Officers in English police forces
Leicester City F.C. non-playing staff
Footballers from Northumberland